João Igor Oliveira de Santana (born 14 March 1996), known as João Igor, is a Brazilian footballer who plays as a midfielder for Sport Recife.

Club career

Santos
João Igor was born in Jardinópolis, São Paulo, and joined Santos' youth setup in 2011, from Olé Brasil. In 2016 he was promoted to the B-team, and made his senior debut on 28 September by starting in a 2–0 home win against Catanduvense, for the year's Copa Paulista.

On 29 September 2017, João Igor signed a new five-year deal with the club.

Sport Recife
On 8 January 2019, João Igor agreed to a short-term loan deal with Série B side Sport Recife. He made his professional debut on 27 January, coming on as a second-half substitute for goalscorer Ezequiel in a 3–1 home win against Náutico for the Campeonato Pernambucano championship. Fourteen days later he scored his first goal, netting the third in a 3–0 home defeat of Petrolina.

João Igor made his Série B debut on 26 April 2019, replacing Ronaldo late into a 1–1 home draw against Oeste. On 30 December, after helping with 15 league matches as Sport achieved promotion to the top tier, he agreed to a permanent two-year deal after the club bought 50% of his economic rights.

Career statistics

Honours
Sport
Campeonato Pernambucano: 2019

References

External links
Sport Recife profile 

1996 births
Living people
Footballers from São Paulo (state)
Brazilian footballers
Association football midfielders
Campeonato Brasileiro Série A players
Campeonato Brasileiro Série B players
Santos FC players
Sport Club do Recife players